Stop the Clock may refer to:

Television
"Stop the Clock!", a 1987 episode of The Raccoons

Songs
 "Stop the Clock", a song by James Blunt from the 2019 album Once Upon a Mind
 "Stop the Clock", a song by Lisa Lougheed from the 1987 album Evergreen Nights